Mesostemma is a genus of flowering plants belonging to the family Caryophyllaceae.

Its native range is Eastern Turkey to Southwestern Siberia and Himalaya.

Species:

Mesostemma alexeenkoanum 
Mesostemma gypsophiloides 
Mesostemma karatavicum 
Mesostemma kotschyanum 
Mesostemma latifolium 
Mesostemma martjanovii 
Mesostemma perfoliatum 
Mesostemma platyphyllum 
Mesostemma schugnanicum

References

Caryophyllaceae
Caryophyllaceae genera